From List of National Natural Landmarks, these are the National Natural Landmarks in Ohio. There are 23 in total.

Ohio
National Natural Landmarks